is a Japanese footballer currently playing as a goalkeeper for Fukushima United.

Career statistics

Club
.

Notes

References

External links

1995 births
Living people
People from Suginami
Association football people from Tokyo
Meiji University alumni
Japanese footballers
Association football goalkeepers
J3 League players
FC Tokyo players
Kataller Toyama players
Kamatamare Sanuki players
Fukushima United FC players